Ohlertidion lundbecki is a species of comb-footed spider in the family Theridiidae. It is found in Greenland.

References

Theridiidae
Spiders described in 1898
Spiders of North America